Sir Henry Alan Currie MC (6 June 1868 – 10 October 1942) was an Australian politician.

He was born in Geelong to grazier John Lang Currie and Louise Johnston. He attended Melbourne Grammar School and then entered into residence at Trinity College (University of Melbourne), while studying civil engineering at the University. From 1896 to 1898 he worked in Western Australia as an assistant engineer for the Public Works Department, before his father died in 1898 and he inherited part of the family estates. On 11 June 1902 he married Muriel Miller. During the First World War he served with the Royal Field Artillery in Belgium and France; he was wounded, mentioned in despatches, and then in 1918 awarded the Military Cross. In 1920 he sold the Mount Elephant property he had co-run with his brother and acquired land at near Burrumbeet under the soldier settler scheme. From 1904 to 1914 he had served on Hampden Shire Council, serving a term as president from 1909 to 1910. In 1928 he was elected to the Victorian Legislative Council as a Nationalist member for Nelson Province. He was briefly a minister without portfolio in December 1929. Knighted in 1937, he served until the abolition of his seat in 1940, at which time he retired. Currie died at Burrumbeet in 1942.

References

1868 births
1942 deaths
Australian Knights Bachelor
Australian recipients of the Military Cross
British Army personnel of World War I
Members of the Victorian Legislative Council
Nationalist Party of Australia members of the Parliament of Victoria
United Australia Party members of the Parliament of Victoria
Royal Field Artillery officers
People educated at Trinity College (University of Melbourne)
Politicians from Geelong
Military personnel from Victoria (Australia)